Ciaran Booth (born 4 May 2000) is an English born, Irish rugby union player, currently playing for Pro14 and European Rugby Champions Cup side Connacht's academy. He plays in the  flanker. He was educated at St Ambrose College and is the Drummer for The Monday Night Club.

Professional Rugby
Booth was originally in the Sale Sharks academy, making one appearance in the Premiership Rugby Cup. He also represented Doncaster Knights while on a dual registration, featuring in 3 games in the RFU Championship.

References

External links
itsrugby.co.uk Profile

2000 births
Living people
Rugby union players from Stockport
Irish rugby union players
Sale Sharks players
Doncaster Knights players
Connacht Rugby players
Rugby union flankers
People educated at St. Ambrose College